Dentatus may refer to:
 Manius Curius Dentatus (died 270 BC), son of Manius, a three-time consul and a plebeian hero of the Roman Republic
 Dimocarpus dentatus, a species of tree related to the Longan

See also 
 Dentatum